Jaap  may refer to:

 Jaap Sahib, Sikh prayer 
 Jaap (given name), Dutch given name (short for "Jacob")

 Jaap, protagonist in the Dutch version of Bobo (Belgian comic)